The Flintstone Kids is an American animated television series produced by Hanna-Barbera. It is an alternative incarnation of the studio's original animated series The Flintstones. The series depicts juvenile versions of the main characters from the original show. It aired from September 13, 1986, to November 14, 1987, on ABC. Unlike the previous shows, this was the first Flintstone series not to have a laugh track.

Overview
The program follows the adventures of Fred Flintstone, Barney Rubble, Wilma Slaghoople, Betty McBricker and Dino as tweens. They share their preadolescence with their friends Nate Slate, Philo Quartz and Dreamchip Gemstone. They also deal with their bully Rocky Ratrock and his group, consisting of Tommy, Flab Slab, Janet Granite and Rocky's dog Stalagbite.

Episodes

Segments
This series featured the following segments:

The Flintstone Kids
The "main" segment of the show. It would either be a single half-hour episode or an 11-minute segment.

Flintstone Funnies
Freddy, Barney, Wilma and Betty dream of exciting fantasy adventures. This segment was dropped in the second season.

Dino's Dilemmas
The adventures and misadventures of Freddy's pet dinosaur Dino.

Captain Caveman and Son
The adventures of Captain Caveman with his son Cavey Jr. as they fight bad guys like the evil genius Mr. Bad. This segment was actually a "show within a show" whereby Captain Caveman and Son is a TV show watched by the main characters, where the "fourth wall" is broken frequently.

Voice cast

 Charlie Adler as Cavey Jr., Armored Car Robber (in "Captain Knaveman")
 Bever-Leigh Banfield as Mayor of Bedrock
 Michael Bell as Mr. Billy Bad
 Mel Blanc as Dino, Bob Rubble, Captain Caveman, Piggy McGrabit (in "Greed It and Weep," "Captain Cavedog")
 Susan Blu as Dreamchip Gemstone, Janet Granite, Mrs. Gemstone
 Hamilton Camp as Barney Rubble, Flab Slab
 Henry Corden as Ed Flintstone, Edna Flintstone
 Julie Dees as Wilma Slaghoople (1986–1987), Mica Slaghoople, Mickey Slaghoople, Tommy
 June Foray as Grandma Cavemom
 Elizabeth Lyn Fraser as Wilma Slaghoople (1987–1988)
 Dana Hill as Criminal (in "Captain Knaveman")
 Buster Jones as Officer Quartz
 Kenneth Mars as Narrator ("Captain Caveman and Son" segments), Armored Car Robber (in "Captain Knaveman"), Museum Robber (in "Captain Knaveman")
 Scott Menville as Freddy Flintstone (1987–1988)
 Bumper Robinson as Philo Quartz
 Michael Rye as Mr. Slaghoople
 Ronnie Schell as Yuckster (in "A Tale of Too Silly," "Day of the Villains," "The Cream -Pier Strikes Back," "Captain Cavedog")
 Marilyn Schreffler as Rocky Ratrock, Flo Rubble
 John Stephenson as Mr. Gemstone, Ditto Master (in "The Ditto Master," "Day of the Villains")
 Jean Vander Pyl as Pearl Pebble-Slaghoople
 B.J. Ward as Betty McBricker, Mrs. Rockbottom
 Beau Weaver as Beaver (Season 1 only)
 Lennie Weinrib as Freddy Flintstone (1986–1987), Police Commissioner
 Frank Welker as Nate Slate, Stalagbite, Fang, fill-ins for Dino and Bob Rubble, Thug (in "Captain Knaveman")

Additional voices

Season 1

 Jon Bauman
 Peter Cullen
 Jim Cummings
 Rick Dees
 Dick Erdman
 Takayo Fischer
 Pat Fraley
 Arte Johnson
 Aron Kincaid
 Rene Levant

 Allan Lurie
 Tress MacNeille
 Janet May
 Howard Morris
 George O'Hanlon
 Rob Paulsen
 Avery Schreiber
 Patric Zimmerman

Season 2

 Bob Arbogast
 James Avery
 Julie Bennett
 Sorrell Booke
 Robin Braxton
 Valri Bromfield
 Arthur Burghardt
 Victoria Carroll
 Kristina Chan
 Townsend Coleman
 Roberto Cruz
 Brian Cummings
 Jennifer Fajardo
 Lillian Garrett

 Ernest Harada
 Robert Ito
 Robbie Lee
 Peter Leeds
 Rene Levant
 Cindy McGee
 Gustavo Palacios
 Helga Pedrini
 Corey Rand
 Shavar Ross
 Marcelo Tubert
 Vernee Watson-Johnson

Broadcast history
The Flintstone Kids''' first season aired on ABC in the 9:00AM Eastern hour, with two half-hour episodes airing back-to-back. The first episode was usually a half-hour story, while the second episode contained three 7-minute segments. In the series' second season, only one episode, containing three 7-minute segments, was shown a week. Four second season episodes paired a new short with reruns of two Season 1 shorts.

Reruns of the series moved to the weekend programming block The Funtastic World of Hanna-Barbera in 1988, only to quickly return to ABC in October due to the failure of The New Adventures of Beany and Cecil. After ABC stopped airing The Flintstone Kids reruns in 1990, The Family Channel aired the series in their Fun Town/Fam TV block from October 15, 1990 to June 3, 1994. Once The Family Channel stopped airing the series, reruns moved to the Cartoon Network, where they aired until 1998, and from 2002 to 2003. The series has also aired on Boomerang.

Home media
On May 4, 2010, Warner Home Video released Saturday Morning Cartoons 1980s, Volume 1, a compilation release which features episodes from various 80's cartoons including an episode from The Flintstone Kids. On March 11, 2014, Warner Home Video released The Flintstone Kids: Rockin' in Bedrock, a 2-disc set featuring 10 episodes from the first season, on DVD in Region 1.

Reception
Critical response
Common Sense Media gave the series a three out of five stars, saying: "Bedrock, the early years: cute and more P.C."

Awards
In 1988, Mary Jo Ludin and Lane Raichert were given the Humanitas Prize for the show's episode "Rocky's Rocky Road".

Other appearances
Cavey Jr. appears in the Harvey Birdman, Attorney at Law episode "Evolutionary War", voiced by Maurice LaMarche.

Cavey Jr. appears in Jellystone!'' voiced by Dana Snyder.

References

External links
 The Flintstone Kids @ The Big Cartoon DataBase
 

The Flintstones spin-offs
1980s American animated television series
1986 American television series debuts
1987 American television series endings
American children's animated comedy television series
American animated television spin-offs
Crossover animated television series
Star Comics titles
Animated television series about children
Television series by Hanna-Barbera
Television series set in prehistory
The Funtastic World of Hanna-Barbera
Child versions of cartoon characters
English-language television shows
American prequel television series
Television series about cavemen